is a fictional character from the Neon Genesis Evangelion franchise, created by Gainax studio. In the anime series of the same name, Rei is an introverted girl chosen as the pilot of a giant mecha named Evangelion Unit 00. At the beginning of the series, Rei is an enigmatic figure whose unusual behavior astonishes her peers. As the series progresses, she becomes more involved with the people around her, particularly her classmate and fellow Eva pilot, Shinji Ikari. Rei appears in the franchise's animated feature films and related media, video games, the original net animation Petit Eva: Evangelion@School, the Rebuild of Evangelion films, and the manga adaptation by Yoshiyuki Sadamoto.

Hideaki Anno, director of the animated series, conceived her as a representation of his unconscious. He was also influenced by his readings on psychology, in particular on Freudian psychoanalysis, taking inspiration from Freud's theories on the Oedipus complex. Other influences for its creation include earlier works by Gainax staff members, such as Aoki Uru, and Paul Gallico's The Snow Goose. Rei is voiced by Megumi Hayashibara in Japanese, and by Amanda Winn-Lee, Brina Palencia and Ryan Bartley in English.

Rei has been well received by critics and in reviews. She has maintained a high ranking in every popularity poll of the series and has also appeared in polls to decide the most popular anime characters in Japan. Reviewers have praised Rei's mysterious aura and her role in the story. Merchandising based on her has also been released, particularly action figures, which became popular. Critics linked her success to a series of moe traits that proved popular with anime fans, influencing the creation of subsequent female anime characters.

Conception

Design 
According to the Neon Genesis Evangelion: The Unofficial Guide by writers Kazuhisa Fujie and Martin Foster, director Hideaki Anno instructed Yoshiyuki Sadamoto on Rei's character design saying, "Whatever else, she needs to be painted in as a bitterly unhappy young girl with little sense of presence." The band Kinniku Shōjo Tai's theme song "Doko e demo ikeru kitte" and its line  inspired Sadamoto to draw Rei. The same band produced a song named , in which a female monologue is audible, and Sadamoto tried to portray a girl with a similar voice. Ukina, a character from Sadamoto's previous work Koto, served as Rei's model, and the artist gave her "shaggy, bobbed, wolf-like hair". Another source of inspiration was The Snow Goose, a novella written by Paul Gallico; the story describes a painting portraying the protagonist, a thin and pale girl in an empty room, and the artist tried to create a character similar to her.

Anno required a "gloomy", "cool character with short hair", so Sadamoto designed Rei originally as a brunette with dark eyes; however, it was necessary to distinguish her from the other female protagonist Asuka Langley Soryu, so he designed her with eye and hair colors opposite to Asuka's. He also published a drawing of a dark-haired character named Yui Ichijō among Rei's designs in one of his artbooks, without specifying whether it is an early conception of Yui Ikari or not. While Asuka was conceived as "an idol-like figure" in Neon Genesis Evangelion and a symbol of "heterosexual desire", Sadamoto designed Rei as a motherhood symbol, thinking of her as "the Yin opposed to Asuka". Anno also suggested that Rei's eye color be red, a feature he believed would give her more personality and distinguish her design from those of the other characters. Her hair color changed to blue, similarly to the main character from Aoki Uru, the movie sequel to The Wings of Honneamise (1987) which was never made. Sadamoto also gave her black stockings, inspired by a women's handball team he saw playing when he was in middle school. Black allowed him to differentiate her from the characters of the series released in the same period and go against their trend.

Development 

Her first name comes from the character Rei Hino of the anime and manga series Sailor Moon. This was done to get one of Sailor Moons directors, Kunihiko Ikuhara, to work on Evangelion. Written in kanji,  can mean "zero", "null". The character  also means "custom", "routine". According to writer Patrick Drazen, her name can be a pun on her Evangelion 00, while for critic Hiroki Azuma it may have been influenced by a character named Zero, the protagonist of the novel Ai to gensō no fascism, written by Ryū Murakami. Anno also took inspiration from Sigmund Freud's psychoanalytic concept of Oedipus complex for her role. He conceived the Evangelion and Rei as palliative mother figures for Shinji; Rei was also conceived as emotionally close to Shinji's father, Gendo, creating a multi-layered Oedipus complex. In a discarded draft of the character background, she was thus a more sensual character than her final version; character designer Sadamoto, however, unlike the more frank and explicit Hideaki Anno, decided to give her a much more "enigmatic" and bland eros.

During Evangelions production and first broadcast, Anno encountered difficulties writing the character, not feeling "particularly interested" or relating to her, but he thought of her as a representation of his unconscious mind, conceiving Rei as "the unconscious Shinji". In the fifth episode ("Rei I"), explicitly dedicated to her character, Rei speaks seven lines and fifty-two words, while in the sixth she has twenty-five lines. Not feeling particularly close to her, the director for a long time forgot to explore Rei's personality, ignoring it or giving it marginal space. In the eighth episode  ("Asuka Strikes!"), for example, she does not appear in any scene, while in the seventh ("A Human Work") he remembered her adding a scene with Rei. As with other Evangelion characters, he transposed aspects of his life into her character, including the choice to not eat meat and maintain a vegetarian diet. At the beginning of the production he also stated that he did not know what would happen to Rei or to the other characters, "because I don't know where life is taking the staff".

Her history has eventually undergone changes. According to Sadamoto and assistant director Kazuya Tsurumaki, she was originally conceived as an alien entity, but staff later went on to make her at least genetically human. Moreover, in the twenty-first episode, the first Rei clone, killed by Naoko Akagi in the final version of the script, would eventually survive after being strangled and having lost consciousness momentarily, awakening in an empty command room without Dr. Akagi, while the death of her second clone was planned by Anno since the beginning. During the production of the fourteenth episode, the director decided to focus on her and "explore her emotion", adding a monologue of Rei. When he was working on the monologue, he wanted to develop her in a "schizophrenic" direction and wondered how to portray a kind of madness. He was loaned a magazine-like book entitled  on mental illness that contained a poem by someone who suffered from a mental disorder, and that triggered his imagination. Moreover, during the production, Ikuhara, annoyed by the idealized image and the fetishism that some fans built around the character, proposed to Anno to "betray" fans and show her as a real girl who gets married and "gets pregnant in the last episode", but Anno rejected the suggestion. Furthermore, in the original finale wanted by Anno, the giant Rei added in the film The End of Evangelion (1997) was not foreseen, since it was conceived at a later time. Anno himself declared he considered her character "already finished" in her smile scene from the sixth episode, since "she and Shinji completely 'communicated' there".

Voice 
Megumi Hayashibara voiced Rei in all her appearances in the original series, as well as the later films, spin-offs, video games and the Rebuild of Evangelion saga. In 1995, Hayashibara said she was somewhat "surprised" by her role and her laconic character saying, "I have to challenge something new." Hayashibara also attended auditions for Asuka and Misato Katsuragi, but after hearing her performance in an OVA named  Anno felt her voice more suited to Rei. She noticed that before Neon Genesis Evangelion there were few taciturn and cold characters to deal with, so, in the absence of examples to imitate, she tried to characterize her "as best I could". During the dub sessions, Hideaki Anno instructed and guided her, advising her to read her lines in the flattest tone possible: "When the director explained her character to me, he said, 'It's not that Rei doesn't have any feelings, it's just that she doesn't understand'." According to Hayashibara, since Rei "doesn't know emotion, there's no difference between what she says and feels". At first glance, her "great beauty" comes from "this surface, not without depth, but with the absence of its necessity". She added, "Rei's beauty comes from the truth that she has feelings", and "when I found the warmth below the coldness in her words, I synchronized with Rei for the first time".

Voicing the mahjong game , she stated that she understood the difference between "lack of intonation" and "absence of emotion" in words. She linked the lack of intonation as a sign of "self-confidence"; an insecure or bad-faith person, in her opinion, would tend to emphasize words, while Rei is completely honest and only tells the truth. The voice actress also reprised the role for the Rebuild. While filming for the third film in the saga, Evangelion: 3.0 You Can (Not) Redo (2012), she worked on parts that weren't fully animated, so she had to ask the director what was happening in the scenes. Hayashibara stated she had to do "countless takes" for Rei's short lines and find the right nuance the staff wanted. She had to dub her as she was indifferent and be careful in conveying her character's feelings of happiness "without overdoing it".

Regarding the final installment, Evangelion: 3.0+1.0 Thrice Upon a Time (2021), a difficult part for her was showing another Rei clone who is slowly growing up; when she tried to be pure she was criticized, and when she tried to be less emotional she was criticized anyway. Anno tried to make the characters younger and with fuller emotions, so it was difficult for the voice actress to get the nuances the director wanted. With Rei's role, Hayashibara's popularity as a voice actor grew, and she became an icon of anime fandom. Shunsuke Nozawa, assistant professor at Hokkaido University, noted how in the 1990s there was an explosion of interest in Japanese voice actors, believing the figure of Hayashibara to be at the center of this change, thanks to the "enormous, societal-level fascination" exerted by Ayanami. Hayashibara thus began to be interviewed about the series and to be regularly invited on television as a celebrity.

Amanda Winn-Lee voices Rei in English in the original series and in the Amazon dubs of the Rebuild of Evangelion films. According to Winn-Lee, despite the cold and detached appearance, there is still "a small spark of humanity" in Rei, "clouded by this huge sense of negative self-worth and the realization that she is expendable". She also stated: "She knows she's expendable, but the thing is, she's still human." In the Funimation dub of the Rebuild of Evangelion films, her role is entrusted to Brina Palencia, while in the Netflix dub she is voiced by Ryan Bartley.

Appearances

Neon Genesis Evangelion 
Rei Ayanami's birth date is never specified in the original series. All data about Rei's past are unknown or erased; her age, 14 in 2015, is the only known fact. Officially, Rei is chosen by an organization called the Marduk Institute as the First Child and pilot of Eva Unit-00 to defeat creatures named Angels for the special agency Nerv under the command of Gendo Ikari. In 2014 she moves to the first municipal middle school of the new city of Tokyo-3, and Gendo becomes her legal guardian. Through the course of the series, Rei, who is originally completely submissive to the will of Gendo, becomes friends with fellow Eva pilot and classmate Shinji Ikari, changing attitude. She also begins to become more aware of her own identity and desires.

In the battle with the Angel Armisael, Rei decides to sacrifice herself alongside Eva Unit-00 to save Shinji and destroy the enemy. After her apparent death, Dr. Ritsuko Akagi reveals she was born in Laboratory for Artificial Evolution's third branch, a place located under lake Ashino and Hakone city. Her body with albino-like traits was created in absolute secrecy from the salvaged remains of Yui Ikari, a brilliant researcher who lost her life in a testing experiment by Evangelion Unit 01. Ritsuko also reveals that in the deepest level of Nerv's headquarters many Rei clones are kept, so that when one Rei dies, she can be replaced. When a clone is activated from a level named Terminal Dogma, although she remains characteristically distinct from all former incarnations, she is endowed with the soul of Lilith, the second Angel. Her memory is eventually saved in an object similar to a spinal column placed in the Central Dogma of the Nerv, the Dummy Plug Plant. In 2010, Gendo brought her first clone (Rei I) to the Gehirn base, the predecessor of Nerv and responsible for the development and construction of the first Evangelion units, introducing her as the daughter an acquaintance had entrusted to him. This first Rei was killed by Dr. Naoko Akagi, colleague and secret lover of Gendō. During her visit to Gehirn, Rei I got lost in the laboratory control room and met Naoko, calling her an "old hag", as if to provoke her. She then revealed that it was Gendo who called Naoko that. Naoko suddenly recognized Yui's facial features in the little girl's face and, in an outburst of violence, she strangled and killed her, after which she committed suicide.

After her sacrifice, Rei II is replaced by a third and final clone. All the other bodies in Terminal Dogma are later destroyed by Ritsuko. Thanks to her close relationship with Shinji, the last Rei decides to rebel against Gendo's will. Rei III thus acts as the main catalyst behind an apocalyptic event named Third Impact. She merges with Lilith, letting Shinji freely decide the course of a process named Human Instrumentality, during which all of mankind unites into one collective consciousness. A giant white and naked Rei emerges into open space during the process, holding Shinji's Eva-01, and, when Shinji rejects Instrumentality, this figure decomposes. After Shinji rematerializes, he briefly sees a version of Rei watching over him from a distance before vanishing.

Rebuild of Evangelion 
Rei returns as a primary character in Rebuild of Evangelion and appears in the first installment of the saga, Evangelion: 1.0 You Are (Not) Alone (2007). Her character remains virtually identical to the anime, acting as a pilot of Evangelion Unit-00 and helping Shinji defeat Angel Ramiel. Writer Thomas LaMarre noted that the Rebuild saga makes the relationship between Shinji and Rei a more central element to the story, increasing and improving the scenes depicting them. In the second movie, Evangelion: 2.0 You Can (Not) Advance (2009), her character develops and her relationship with Shinji is shown much more openly than in the original series. In a departure from her original traits, she attempts to host a dinner party for her fellow pilots. Anno first thought to use this idea for the fourth episode of the original anime, but the proposal was shelved during the production of the series. During the climax, Angel Zeruel devours Rei and Unit-00. When Unit-01 goes out of control, Shinji forces his way into the Angel pulling her out, and the two embrace each other; at the end of the fight, they are both trapped within Unit-01 as the action triggers the Third Impact. During the feature film, it is also suggested that Gendō and Fuyutsuki plan to bring Shinji and Rei together.  Assistant director Tsurumaki was asked about this after the release of the feature film; according to him, the impression of a strategy to bring Shinji and Rei together was a result of the complex script writing, and "Anno probably hasn’t thought about that very deeply".

In the third installment, Evangelion: 3.0 You Can (Not) Redo (2012), set fourteen years later, the same Rei does not appear; a different clone is introduced instead, who acts differently than the other Rei, maintaining a cold and silent demeanor. In Evangelion: 3.0+1.0 Thrice Upon a Time (2021), the last film of the saga, Rei's new clone, named Ayanami (Tentative Name), heads together with Shinji and Asuka Shikinami to a small town called Village 3, inhabited by survivors of the various Impacts that occurred and isolated from the outside world, almost uninhabitable. Here Rei interacts with the adult Toji Suzuhara and Hikari Horaki, old schoolmates of the previous clone, with the children and women of Village 3, helping them to work in the fields; with time the new Ayanami begins to develop her individuality, gradually discovering the world around her and learning to socialize with the inhabitants. After some time, however, Rei (Tentative Name), whose real name turns out to be Ayanami-Type No.006, is unable to maintain her form without continuous contact with the Evangelion's LCL liquid and dies in front of Shinji. During the Instrumentality, Shinji meets again the Rei of fourteen years before, who remained inside the Eva-01. The old Rei, with visibly long hair, argues with her companion, who decides to live in a world without Evangelions and give the world a new birth, Neon Genesis. Rei and Shinji then say goodbye to each other for the last time, shaking hands and smiling.

In other media 
In the official Neon Genesis Evangelion manga, by Yoshiyuki Sadamoto, further differences are evident in the characterization of Rei. In the manga, she is generally more empathetic and open to human contact compared to her animated counterpart. In the comic, moreover, the character has more space than Asuka, who in the anime has a predominant role. Compared to the classic series, Sadamoto tried to tread his hand on her relationship with Shinji, particularly insisting on the symbology of the touch of the hands and the theme of motherhood, inspired by Kazuo Umezu's The Drifting Classroom. As in the series, she at first considers herself empty and useless, created solely for piloting the Evangelion under Ikari's orders; Shinji's touch changes his attitude. In a scene from the fifth volume of the manga where they are both at Rei's house, Rei gets burned while preparing tea with Shinji and their hands touch for a moment. Taking advantage of the opportunity, Rei invites Shinji to speak to his father and open up to him; in another chapter, thinking back to that moment, she wonders if her hands will one day be able to touch Shinji again. During the clash with the Angel Armisael, Rei becomes increasingly aware of her feelings of sadness and affection towards Shinji, towards whom she demonstrates a certain romantic interest. Sadamoto himself described Shinji and Rei's feelings as mutual love.

In a scene from the last episode of the animated series, an alternate reality is presented with a different story than the previous episodes; Rei is presented as a girl who has just moved into the class of Asuka and Shinji, with a cheerful, distracted and irascible personality. An outgoing Rei is featured in some Neon Genesis Evangelion spin-offs, such as Neon Genesis Evangelion: Angelic Days, set in the alternate reality of the last episode. In the original web anime series Petit Eva: Evangelion@School, a parody of the original animated series, three Ayanami sisters are presented, one is diligent and introverted; another sport oriented and extroverted; and another is a four-year-old girl with a passion for soft toys. In Neon Genesis Evangelion: Anima, set three years after End of Evangelion in an alternate scenario, several Rei appears; Rei Troi, pilot of an Eva named Evangelion Unit-02 Type II Allegorica, Rei Quatre, Rei Cinq and the seven-year-old version Rei Six, all of them pilots of Evangelion-0.0 units. In Neon Genesis Evangelion: Campus Apocalypse, Rei shares a mysterious connection with Kaworu that triggers Shinji's attention. She is also present in Neon Genesis Evangelion: Legend of the Piko Piko Middle School Students. In a simulation game entitled Neon Genesis Evangelion: Ayanami Raising Project, the player takes on the task of looking after Rei. She is also available as a romantic option in Neon Genesis Evangelion: Girlfriend of Steel 2nd, Neon Genesis Evangelion 2, Neon Genesis Evangelion: Shinji Ikari Raising Project and its manga adaptation, wherein she is a distant cousin of Shinji.

In addition to games based on the original series, Rei has appeared in media not related to the Evangelion franchise, such as Monster Strike, Super Robot Wars, Tales of Zestiria, Puzzle & Dragons, Keri hime sweets, Summons Board, Puyopuyo!! Quest, Line Rangers, Unison, MapleStory, Valkyrie Connect, Ragnarok Online, The Battle Cats and in an official Shinkansen Henkei Robo Shinkalion crossover episode.

Characterization and themes 

Rei Ayanami is a taciturn girl who limits relations as much as possible and mechanically executes any order given to her, even if particularly cruel. She is introverted, socially detached and laconic. Sociologist Satomi Ishikawa noticed that in a scene from the sixth episode of the series, "Rei II", her companion Shinji asks her the reason that pushes her to want to pilot Evangelion 00; Rei replies saying she finds her only "bond" with other people in this, thus demonstrating that she is committed to the struggle against the Angels "as if it were the only reason why she exists". Throughout the series she proves to be indifferent to life  and engages herself in drastic acts that could cost her life. The Artifice's writer Justin Wu noticed that, unlike other characters from the series, she does not care if she dies, and embraces death "as if death is the only way to prove that she has lived".

For the critic Gerald Alva Miller, despite her cold attitude, Rei experiences feelings of alienation and existential angst. Gualtiero Cannarsi, who cured the Italian adaptation for the series, similarly described Rei as a girl "unaware of the most basic rules of life and hygiene", as she has had no one to teach them to her, resulting in her being disinterested in them. Her attitude is reflected in her apartment, where hygiene is neglected. In one episode Ritsuko Akagi says, like Commander Ikari, she "is not very adept at living". Scattered on the floor of her apartment are scientific texts on biological interactions and genetics written in Latin alphabet in the original series, and The Happy Prince and Other Tales in the Rebuild of Evangelion series. Critic Susan J. Napier also noticed that in the last two episodes she confesses to wanting to die and "go back to nothing". According to Evangelion character designer Yoshiyuki Sadamoto, she is "translucent", like a shadow or "the air": "The kind of girl you can't touch. The girl you long for, but there is nothing about her that you can grab a hold onto." He also interpreted Asuka and Rei as "strong characters, in their own separate ways". Furthermore, Hayashibara described her as an "ethereal character"; according to her: "Her emotions are like waves, so if I was off by even one millimeter it would affect her character, and I'd have to redo it".

During a show a little girl asked Hideaki Anno what Rei likes, and he replied that he never thought about it. According to him, she does not appreciate her own life, hurts herself and feels she does not need friends, being aware of the fact that "there'll be another to replace her": "Her presence, her existence—ostensible existence—is ephemeral. She's a very sad girl. She only has the barest minimum of what she needs to have". Anno also likened the Japanese national attraction to characters like Rei as the product of a stunted imaginative landscape born of Japan's defeat in the Second World War, because "since that time, the education we received is not one that creates adults". The architect Kaichiro Morikawa compared the face of the first Rei, usually presented in a distorted and deformed way, to the installations of Tony Oursler, also comparing her bedroom to Gottfried Helnwein's photographs. Writer Claudio Cordella associated her personality to that of the female characters portrayed by the painter Edward Burne-Jones, and her gaze to the "fixed and lifeless eyes" of the Olympia from The Tales of Hoffmann. Takekuma Kentaro also linked the image of Rei in bandages to the photos of Romain Slocombe, while Sadamoto compared her to the works of mangaka Sensha Yoshida. In an interview with Anno, Japanese writer and academic Ōizumi Mitsunari likened the figure of Rei to the girls committed to the Japanese sect Aum Shinrikyō, which carried out the Tokyo subway sarin attack in 1995, as "completely dependent on their guru", Shōkō Asahara. The book Schizo Evangelion, edited by him, describes her as "a sacrifice offered to all the Japanese mama's boys and sadists" and in a series of dichotomies, such as opium and euphoria, Satan and God, "the infinite power of Eros" and "the blinding power of Thanatos at the same time", "a sarin prepared by Gendo Ikari for his plan to destroy humanity", the "keyhole of Pandora's box" and the Great Bad Mother trying to take in her son.

For the scholar Hiroki Azuma, Rei Ayanami introduces a "new type of solitude". Before her, anime characters were divided between sociable girls, with expensive clothes and cosmetics, technological gadgets and often engaged in prostitution activities named kogal, and otaku, isolated characters, with rooms full of "computer software" and magazines. Rei, according to Azuma, transcends the two stereotypes; he likened her room to Satyam, scientific laboratories of Aum Shinrikyō. Critic Krystian Woznicki also compared her to Pinocchio in the film 964 Pinocchio (1991), but "Rei's character is quite realistic, whereas Pinocchio is completely removed from reality". Japanese critic Tamaki Saitō described her as "the culmination of the pygmalionism that began with Nanako SOS", while Kenneth Lee noted a similarity in her path of self-awareness with Pinocchio and Key from Key the Metal Idol. Furthermore, writer Tamaki Saito reported that Ami Mizuno from Pretty Guardian Sailor Moon has been interpreted as "the prototype" of Rei.

Critics linked her silent and inexpressive personality to alexithymia or a schizoid personality disorder. An official Death and Rebirth booklet describes her as "an expressionless noh mask" and "a girl who does not dream", while the book Schizo Evangelion as "a dreamless mind, completely separated from Jung's collective unconscious". According to Yoshiyuki Sadamoto, Rei is capable of feeling emotions and feelings but has expressive and communicative difficulties. From the first episodes of the series, Shinji tries to connect with her; however, Rei is unable to parse the meaning of his words and actions adequately. Although the two pilots occasionally converse with each other, they cannot communicate on an emotional level and do not understand their feelings. However, facing a crying Shinji, who is glad that she is alive after a big fight in the sixth episode, she smiles, marking one of her most significant moments of character development. After this, both their words and actions move to a place of mutual understanding. For critic Manabu Tsuribe, with her smile in the sixth episode Neon Genesis Evangelion reaches its climax, and "as a story of 'growth and independence of a boy' — like a Bildungsroman — ended there once. Evangelion as a story has stopped there". In the last episodes of the series this Rei dies and is replaced by another clone, who acts like a stranger to Shinji. Anno compared the story after her smile scene, in which there is a step back in interpersonal communication, to Hideki Gō, a character from the Return of Ultraman series; Gō seems to get closer to other people and his colleagues from the Monster Attack Team, but "then next week things begin again from [a position of] estrangement". He also added: "At that point something emerges of my mistrust or fear of communication with others".

Academic Frenchy Lunning described Rei as Shinji's anima. In one of the first scenes of the Evangelion anime, Shinji sees a ghost of Rei Ayanami in a deserted city near Tokyo-3. The Rei visible in the sequence is not the real Rei; the appearance has been connected to the scenario of the film The End of Evangelion, released in 1997 as a conclusion to the classic series. During the film, all forms of life come together in one being during the Instrumentality; human beings, shortly before dying, see Rei's ghosts appear, guiding them in the process as "messengers of redemption". According to Yūichirō Oguro, editor of some of the contents of the Japanese home video editions of Evangelion, the Rei's ghost Shinji sees on the avenue is "the existence that gazes upon man", and the scene symbolizes that "Shinji is protected by his mother since the beginning of the series". For screenwriter Yōji Enokido, she produces in young men a feeling of distance "as though they were still half in the womb". Patrick Drazen and Dani Cavallaro noticed that, like other Neon Genesis Evangelion characters who have traits of some deities of Shinto mythology, Rei has affinities with the goddess of the Sun, Amaterasu, who is reborn at every dawn. They also compared the show's two other protagonists, Shinji and Asuka, with Susanoo and Ama-no-Uzume, respectively; Shinji, like Susanoo, has clumsily social manners and unsociable behavior, while Asuka, like Uzume, is ebullient and flaunts her body. According to Italian scholar Fabio Bartoli, her three incarnations could be linked to the three evolutionary stages of the soul postulated by the Jewish Qabbalah—Nephesh (the mere animal vitality), Ruach (the normal human soul) and Neshamah (the elevated spirit, after the connection between man and God). Her image is often flanked by that of the Moon, a celestial body associated with motherhood, pallor, passivity, and femininity. Japanese engineer Yumiko Yano noticed a hieratic and unattainable aura in Rei Ayanami, comparing her to the Virgin Mary. Yano also associated her figure with the fragile and chaste women portrayed in fin de siècle art, particularly popular among the works of Symbolists painters. For Kazuya Tsurumaki, Shinji feels a sexual and incestuous desire for her, while Kentaro Takekuma described her as an "eternal virgin".

Cultural impact

Popularity  

Reception to Rei's character has been positive. Since 1995, she became the subject of homages from the Neon Genesis Evangelion fandom, including fan fictions, fan arts and dōjinshi, proving popular. Writer Patrick W. Galbraith described her as "the single most popular and influential character in the history of otaku anime". She also ranked highly in popularity surveys. Immediately after Evangelion's first airing concluded, the 1996 and 1997 Anime Grand Prix survey by Animage magazine elected Rei best female character of the moment. In 1998, when Revival of Evangelion was released, she ranked fifth as the most popular Evangelion female character. Rei also appeared in the monthly surveys of the magazine, remeaning in the top ten in 1997 and 1998 and in the top twenty in the 1999 polls. In 2002 TV Asahi ranked her 36th among the 100 most loved characters in anime history. TV Asahi later published the results of polls on anime's greatest scenes; all the Evangelion scenes which ranked in the lists were related to the character.

Rei Ayanami also won first place in Newtype magazine popularity charts. In July 2005, for example, she emerged tenth, and the magazine itself wrote that: "Her many charms and mysteries continue to shine and captivate fans even now, ten years after the broadcast". In August and September 2009, after the release of Evangelion 2.0: You Can (Not) Advance, she ranked in fourth and second place. In October, she took third place, becoming the most popular Evangelion female character. Rei was also voted the most popular female anime character from the 1990s in a Newtype poll in March 2010. In 2015, almost twenty years after its debut, she conquered the first place among the female characters favored by fans, thus beating all the heroines of the anime of the season, while in 2018 Rebuild Rei was included among the best thirty characters of the previous decade. In 2013 the NHK Shibuya Anime Land radio show ranked her among the ten top anime heroines of all time.

For Oricon News, Rei's character has become Evangelions emblem. She also ranked in Evangelion popularity polls, usually in the top three. A column in the September 2007 issue of the Nihon Keizai Shimbun newspaper said, on the occasion of Evangelion 1.0 theatrical release, that there were over one million dedicated Rei fans in Japan and that, "This bandaged Goddess is an icon of Japanese anime." She also had a place in Mania Entertainment's ten iconic anime heroines list written by Thomas Zoth, who commented on the large amount of merchandise based on her: "Shops in Akihabara struggled to keep Rei Ayanami figurines and toys in stock. ... Many critics also credit Ayanami for starting the moe boom in anime, with its reliance on weak, vulnerable characters that the audience would desire to protect". In March and April 2021, after release of the final Rebuild film, she finished eighth and sixth most popular female character in a Newtype poll, and sixth and second place in May and June.

Critical reception 
Rei has been well-received by anime critics. Japanese cultural critic Hiroki Azuma described her as "an extremely impressive character", praising the performance of Megumi Hayashibara and its psychological realism, since "Rei's solitude is grounded in a completely tactile substantiality which gives us extremely realistic images of the discommunication that children of the present face". Newtype praised the fifth and the sixth episode, describing the drawings of the scene in which she smiles at Gendo in "Rei I" as "excellent", and the scene where she greets Shinji before the battle against the Angel Ramiel in "Rei II" as "impressive". In February 1996, Animedia magazine ranked her smile scene from the sixth episode among the most memorable anime moments of the month. The Artifice writer Justin Wu also praised the scene, describing it as a "powerful" and "iconic moment", since it is "the first time she has deliberately shown an emotion, and one of the handful of times she has done so throughout the whole series". Screen Rant and Comic Book Resources praised her development and the various revelations about her identity, placing her among the best characters in the series. Science-Fiction Weekly's Tasha Robinson expressed appreciation for the character's conclusion. Comic Book Resources' Luke Penn positively received the differences introduced in Sadamoto's manga and the increased space dedicated to her. IGN ranked her tenth on its list of the top twenty-five anime characters of all time. Writer Chris Mackenzie described her as "a hugely influential character concept"; Mackenzie also found Rei different from similar characters created after Evangelion, since: "The difference between Rei and so many almost-Reis is that there might be something behind the façade."

Other critics expressed a negative opinion of the character. The Anime-planet.com site, while appreciating some interesting revelations about her past and still considering her "by far the most interesting character", was critical that her character had not been "explored as much as she should have been". Animecritics.com wrote, "[Rei] has absolutely no personality to speak of, and she remains an enigma for most of the series. Part of the intrigue in the series is discovering the secrets she holds." THEM Anime Reviews' Raphael See criticized the characterization of the whole Evangelion cast for being "cliche", saying he did not understand the reasons for her great popularity. Anime News Network's Kenneth Lee considered her character arc a wasted opportunity, as he considered that "a 'dummy shell,' gaining a soul could had an entire series devoted to it". Comic Book Resources' Anthony Gramuglia praised her character design but criticized her lack of development, especially in the 1997 cinematic finale.

While reviewing the Rebuild of Evangelion films, writers from Anime News Network praised Rei's character development. On Evangelion 1.0, Carlo Santos noticed that Rei's personality is the same as in the TV series, and "those who hated the original Evangelion for its highly dysfunctional characters still won't find anything to like in this version", while Justin Sevakis praised her response to Shinji's kindness in Evangelion 2.0. UK Anime described Rebuild's Rei as a more human character who is easier to empathize with. The Fandom Post appreciated the fact that she becomes progressively more independent from Gendo, while Anime News Network's Mark Sombillo wrote: "Her personality and plight form much more of the core motivation of the story and despite her still tryingly hesitant attempts at communication, there's genuine warmth beneath her actions and it's hard not to be won over by her".

Her role in the last installment of the saga, Evangelion 3.0+1.0, received a particularly positive reception from critics and reviewers, especially for its optimistic view. Critics praised her journey and campy scenes in the first part of the film as "immersive" and "moving". Crunchyroll's Daryl Harding described them as "one of the nicest parts of the film". The Otaku Revolution website positively compared Rebuild's Rei with the one of the television series, also praising the warmth of her actions and her growth path: "She's allowed to be more animated, even as she is alien, a wonderful dichotomy that makes her part of the story irresistible". Geek Ireland praised how Thrice Upon a Time gives a sense of conclusion to Rei, Shinji, and the other characters, while Paste magazine lauded the fact that the movie shows Rei and the other pilots outside the militarized and violent context of the battles. According to Gizmodo, she has "the most complete journey" among those presented by 3.0+1.0, while Otaku Voice wrote that: "Watching Rei discover the real world through her childlike eyes of wonder is one of the greatest pleasures of the film". Otaquest's Chris Cimi similarly praised her character development, saying that her actions "make for something different and warm", but "still Evangelion".

Merchandise 

Mania.com's Thomas Zoth wrote, "Rei Ayanami proved such a popular character that she started a merchandising boom". Her image was used in a wide range of products, including toys, t-shirts, action figures, musical instruments, life-size statues, makeup, accessories and reproductions of her clothing. On March 30, 2001, King Records launched an album entitled Evangelion: The Birthday of Rei Ayanami. The following year, a reproduction of the girl's bedroom was built, and a life-size model was exhibited at the Eva Expo in Shanghai. In 2020, Honda used Rei and other characters from the series for a number of commercials, which aired on the occasion of a collaboration between Evangelion and Honda Civic.

In 2007 her costumes ranked first among the best selling cosplay costumes of the year by the company Cospa. Rei Ayanami's action figures also enjoyed success. Writer Thomas LaMarre wrote that Sadamoto's design for the character became "the sensation of the series", selling "an unprecedented number of figurines" and spurring expensive speculation about her character in the press and the world of anime criticism. The high sales of Ayanami merchandise have been described by scholar Patrick Galbraith as a turning point for the Japanese market, since they helped to expand the figures and fanzines sector, with "entire fanzine conventions .... committed to the series and its characters". According to one estimate, plastic models before Evangelion sold about three thousand units, but Rei's figures managed to reach ten times that amount, and for Galbraith "the series overlapped with a boom in figurines of anime characters and the spread of the Internet, making otaku consumption and community more conspicuous". Newtype USA magazine similarly wrote that: "Hordes of otaku flooded Akihabara in search of the enigmatic Rei Ayanami, and companies realized for the first time that catering to the geek crowd could be very profitable. ... Akihabara itself has transformed from an 'electric town' famous for household appliances to the geek paradise it is today".

In 2005, to celebrate the tenth anniversary of the first airing of Evangelion, mangaka Mine Yoshizaki designed several action figures of the Angels with anthropomorphic appearances; among the various models, he devised a figure of the Angel Lilith inspired by Rei's character design. According to Japanese writer Kazuhisa Fujie, despite models and toys in the series were a commercial failure at first, Rei's action figures immediately became so popular that they exceeded Evangelion's unit sales, thus creating the first and perhaps the only case of a robotic anime "where reproductions of the human characters outsold those of the robots". Furthermore, books and magazines portraying her on the cover were successful. She also appeared on the cover of an issue of Rolling Stone Japanese edition, among others. An artbook about her named  was published in 1997. According to Fujie, sales of Rei-themed merchandise led Japanese media to call her "the girl who manipulates magazine sales at will", "the fastest route to the sold-out sign" and "the Premium Girl".

Legacy 

Rei Ayanami had a significant influence on Japanese animation and subsequent fictional characters. Following the fame gained by Evangelion, other characters with its aesthetic and character traits were created. Critics regarded Rei and her success as the beginning of the moe phenomenon, with the creation of characters according to definite stereotyped features easily recognizable and consumable by the Japanese otaku audience. In the late 1990s, characters bearing a close resemblance to Rei have been produced and consumed on a massive scale in comics, anime, and novelizations, both in the commercial market and the fanzine market.

According to Japanese scholar Hiroki Azuma, this output is not linked to a direct Evangelion influence, since "the emergence of Ayanami Rei did not influence many authors so much as change the rules of the moe-elements sustaining otaku culture". As a result, even authors who were not deliberately thinking of Evangelion began to produce characters resembling Rei, using newly registered moe-elements, such as a quiet personality, blue hair, white skin, mysterious power and an absence of emotions. For Azuma, moreover, the twenty-sixth episode, in which an alternative reality with Rei running with a slice of bread in her mouth is shown, constitutes a turning point within the otaku culture. The scene, according to him, represents the point where the era of great stories ends and that of moe characters begins; from that point on, therefore, the emotional response to the protagonists would become more important than the plot of the series. He also regarded Ruriko Tsukishima from Shizuku as being directly influenced by Rei, and Ruri Hoshino of Martian Successor Nadesico as a combination of both.

Critics compared other characters to her, including Miharu in Gasaraki, Vanilla H in Galaxy Angel, Maya in Geobreeders, Neya in Infinite Ryvius, Aruto Kirihara in Kagihime Monogatari Eikyū Alice Rondo, Riza Hawkeye in Fullmetal Alchemist, Dorothy R. Wayneright in The Big O, Anthy Himemiya in Revolutionary Girl Utena, Chise in Saikano, Yuzuriha Inori in Guilty Crown, Miyu in My-HiME, Ai in Zaion: I Wish You Were Here, Diya in Butterfly Soup, Yashiro Kasumi in Muv-Luv and the female cyborgs in Gunslinger Girl. Serial Experiments Lains Lain Iwakura was also associated with the character; Lains main screenwriter Chiaki J. Konaka stated he was not influenced by Evangelion and, while appreciating their characteristics, he said he did not see similarities between the two characters. Eureka from Eureka Seven has similarly been compared to Rei Ayanami, causing dissatisfaction in series screenwriter Dai Satō. Rurouni Kenshin's author Nobuhiro Watsuki compared Yukishiro Tomoe to Rei. He said Yukishiro became an Ayanami lookalike, with the only unique feature being her black pupils. The author originally conceived her as a "cool beauty", but, once she revealed her true feelings in the end, she became a different character.

The Artifice writer Justin Wu regards Rei as the prototypical , a term used by anime fans to describe reticent and emotionless characters, usually with a monotone voice who speak to-the-point, and avoid unnecessary conversations. This moe element, which gained wide popularity only after Rei's success, can be found in numerous subsequent female characters, including Eva in Black Cat, Ai Enma in Hell Girl, and Yuki Nagato in Haruhi Suzumiya. The character is also credited to have popularized the kuudere stereotype, a term for male or female characters who hide their true feelings behind a melancholic and cold facade. According to Kaichiro Morikawa, a Japanese architect and academic, characters with physical defects before Evangelion and Rei Ayanami were rare, such as Char Aznable in Mobile Suit Gundam, who has a scar on his forehead, and Princess Kushana in Nausicaä of the Valley of the Wind. Justin Wu also noticed that, after the success of the series, the bandages gained great popularity, becoming the trademark of the character and a common feature in cosplays.

Japanese band Rey derived its name from her. Singer and guitarist Motoo Fujiwara wrote the lyrics of the song "Arue" taking inspiration from Rei, with the English title "R.A." inspired by the initial letters of her name. Ging Nang Boyz album Door features a song named . According to the Japanese site Animentalism, the track "Ray" by rock band Luna Sea, published in the single In Silence and composed by Sugizo, could be a tribute to Rei Ayanami. Artists have produced fan arts about her, including Okama, Huke, Hiroya Oku and Arina Tanemura. Celebrities paid tribute to Rei cosplaying her, including Shoko Nakagawa, Natsuki Katō, Miu Nakamura, Yuuri Morishita, Umika Kawashima, Rio Uchida, Kokoro Shinozaki and Shōma Uno. During Victoria's Secret Fashion Show 2012 English model Jourdan Dunn wore a dress similar to the character's plugsuit; Gainax only learned about the outfit from the Internet and was perplexed by the situation. Saekano: How to Raise a Boring Girlfriend contains a reference to the character. Rei's image appeared on a shirt of a character from the Veronica's Closet series. Further references have been identified in other Japanese animated series, including Joshiraku, Wotakoi: Love Is Hard for Otaku, Gurren Lagann, and Nisemonogatari, in which her line from the sixth episode "You won't die, because I'll protect you" is parodied. According to Vogue, her plugsuit also inspired a piece of clothing for the spring 2016 line by the fashion house Louis Vuitton.

See also

References

Bibliography 

 
 
 
  
 
 
 
 
 
 
 
 

Female characters in anime and manga
Television characters introduced in 1995
Animated characters introduced in 1995
Child characters in animated television series
Fictional avatars
Fictional child soldiers
Fictional clones
Fictional Japanese people in anime and manga
Fictional Japanese people
Fictional suicides
Female soldier and warrior characters in anime and manga
Neon Genesis Evangelion characters
Science fiction film characters
Female characters in film
Fictional private military members
Teenage characters in television
Teenage characters in anime and manga